The  is a river in Chiba Prefecture, Japan. Under the Rivers Act of 1906 the Ichinomiya is designated as a Class 2 River. The river basin of the Ichinomiya was a social, cultural, and economic center of Kazusa Province in pre-modern Japan. Although very shallow, the river was used to transport sardines from Kujukuri Beach to Tokyo Bay until the beginning of the Meiji period.

Geography
The source of the Ichinomiya River is in the Fukusawa District of  Chōnan, and crosses the southern part of the Kujukuri Plain through Ōtaki, Nagara, Mobara, and Mutsuzawa, and the town of Ichinomiya. It pours into the Pacific Ocean in the Ichimatsu District of the village of Chōsei.

Tributaries

Mizusawa River
Habu River
Chōrakuji River
Obuta River
Satsubo River
Tsurue River
Aku River
Toyoda River
Sanzu River
Mizugami River

Sources 

Rivers of Chiba Prefecture
Rivers of Japan